Missile guidance refers to a variety of methods of guiding a missile or a guided bomb to its intended target. The missile's target accuracy is a critical factor for its effectiveness. Guidance systems improve missile accuracy by improving its Probability of Guidance (Pg).

These guidance technologies can generally be divided up into a number of categories, with the broadest categories being "active", "passive", and "preset" guidance. Missiles and guided bombs generally use similar types of guidance system, the difference between the two being that missiles are powered by an onboard engine, whereas guided bombs rely on the speed and height of the launch aircraft for propulsion.

History
The concept of unmanned guidance originated at least as early as World War I, with the idea of remotely guiding an airplane bomb onto a target, such as the systems developed for the first powered drones by Archibald Low (The Father of Radio Guidance).

In World War II, guided missiles were first developed, as part of the German V-weapons program. Project Pigeon was American behaviorist B.F. Skinner's attempt to develop a pigeon-guided bomb.

The first U.S. ballistic missile with a highly accurate inertial guidance system was the short-range PGM-11 Redstone.

Categories of guidance systems

Guidance systems are divided into different categories according to whether they are designed to attack fixed or moving targets. The weapons can be divided into two broad categories: Go-onto-target (GOT) and go-onto-location-in-space (GOLIS) guidance systems. A GOT missile can target either a moving or fixed target, whereas a GOLIS weapon is limited to a stationary or near-stationary target. 
The trajectory that a missile takes while attacking a moving target is dependent upon the movement of the target. A moving target can be an immediate threat to the missile launcher. The target must be promptly eliminated in order to preserve the launcher. In GOLIS systems, the problem is simpler because the target is not moving.

GOT systems

In every go-onto-target system there are three subsystems:
 Target tracker
 Missile tracker
 Guidance computer

The way these three subsystems are distributed between the missile and the launcher result in two different categories:
 Remote control guidance: The guidance computer is on the launcher. The target tracker is also placed on the launching platform.
 Homing guidance: The guidance computers are in the missile and in the target tracker.

Remote control guidance
These guidance systems usually need the use of radars and a radio or wired link between the control point and the missile; in other words, the trajectory is controlled with the information transmitted via radio or wire (see Wire-guided missile). These systems include:
 Command guidance – The missile tracker is on the launching platform. These missiles are fully controlled by the launching platform that sends all control orders to the missile. The two variants are
 Command to line-of-sight (CLOS)
 Command off line-of-sight (COLOS)
 Line-of-sight beam riding guidance (LOSBR) – The target tracker is on board the missile. The missile already has some orientation capability meant for flying inside the beam that the launching platform is using to illuminate the target. It can be manual or automatic.

Command to line-of-sight
The CLOS system uses only the angular coordinates between the missile and the target to ensure the collision. The missile is made to be in the line of sight between the launcher and the target (LOS), and any deviation of the missile from this line is corrected. Since so many types of missile use this guidance system, they are usually subdivided into four groups: A particular type of command guidance and navigation where the missile is always commanded to lie on the line of sight (LOS) between the tracking unit and the aircraft is known as command to line of sight (CLOS) or three-point guidance. That is, the missile is controlled to stay as close as possible on the LOS to the target after missile capture is used to transmit guidance signals from a ground controller to the missile. More specifically, if the beam acceleration is taken into account and added to the nominal acceleration generated by the beam-rider equations, then CLOS guidance results. Thus, the beam rider acceleration command is modified to include an extra term. The beam-riding performance described above can thus be significantly improved by taking the beam motion into account. CLOS guidance is used mostly in shortrange air defense and antitank systems.

Manual command to line-of-sight

Both target tracking and missile tracking and control are performed manually. The operator watches the missile flight, and uses a signaling system to command the missile back into the straight line between operator and target (the "line of sight"). This is typically useful only for slower targets, where significant "lead" is not required. MCLOS is a subtype of command guided systems. In the case of glide bombs or missiles against ships or the supersonic Wasserfall against slow-moving B-17 Flying Fortress bombers this system worked, but as speeds increased MCLOS was quickly rendered useless for most roles.

Semi-manual command to line-of-sight
Target tracking is automatic, while missile tracking and control is manual.

Semi-automatic command to line-of-sight

Target tracking is manual, but missile tracking and control is automatic. It is similar to MCLOS but some automatic systems position the missile in the line of sight while the operator simply tracks the target. SACLOS has the advantage of allowing the missile to start in a position invisible to the user, as well as generally being considerably easier to operate. It is the most common form of guidance against ground targets such as tanks and bunkers.

Automatic command to line-of-sight
Target tracking, missile tracking and control are automatic.

Command off line-of-sight
This guidance system was one of the first to be used and still is in service, mainly in anti-aircraft missiles. In this system, the target  tracker and the missile tracker can be oriented in different directions. The guidance system ensures the interception of the target by the missile by locating both in space. This means that they will not rely on the angular coordinates like in CLOS systems. They will need another coordinate which is distance. To make it possible, both target and missile trackers have to be active. They are always automatic and the radar has been used as the only sensor in these systems. The SM-2MR Standard is inertially guided during its mid-course phase, but it is assisted by a COLOS system via radar link provided by the AN/SPY-1 radar installed in the launching platform.

Line-of-sight beam riding guidance

LOSBR uses a "beam" of some sort, typically radio, radar or laser, which is pointed at the target and detectors on the rear of the missile keep it centered in the beam. Beam riding systems are often SACLOS, but do not have to be; in other systems the beam is part of an automated radar tracking system. A case in point is the later versions of the RIM-8 Talos missile as used in Vietnam – the radar beam was used to take the missile on a high arcing flight and then gradually brought down in the vertical plane of the target aircraft, the more accurate SARH homing being used at the last moment for the actual strike. This gave the enemy pilot the least possible warning that his aircraft was being illuminated by missile guidance radar, as opposed to search radar. This is an important distinction, as the nature of the signal differs, and is used as a cue for evasive action.

LOSBR suffers from the inherent weakness of inaccuracy with increasing range as the beam spreads out. Laser beam riders are more accurate in this regards, but are all short-range, and even the laser can be degraded by bad weather. On the other hand, SARH becomes more accurate with decreasing distance to the target, so the two systems are complementary.

Homing guidance

Proportional navigation 

Proportional navigation (also known as "PN" or "Pro-Nav") is a guidance principle (analogous to proportional control) used in some form or another by most homing air target missiles. It is based on the fact that two objects are on a collision course when the direction of their direct line-of-sight does not change. PN dictates that the missile velocity vector should rotate at a rate proportional to the rotation rate of the line of sight (line-Of-sight rate or LOS-rate) and in the same direction.

Radar homing

Active homing

Active homing uses a radar system on the missile to provide a guidance signal. Typically, electronics in the missile keep the radar pointed directly at the target, and the missile then looks at this "angle" of its own centerline to guide itself. Radar resolution is based on the size of the antenna, so in a smaller missile these systems are useful for attacking only large targets, ships or large bombers for instance. Active radar systems remain in widespread use in anti-shipping missiles, and in "fire-and-forget" air-to-air missile systems such as the AIM-120 AMRAAM and R-77.

Semi-active homing

Semi-active homing systems combine a passive radar receiver on the missile with a separate targeting radar that "illuminates" the target. Since the missile is typically being launched after the target was detected using a powerful radar system, it makes sense to use that same radar system to track the target, thereby avoiding problems with resolution or power, and reducing the weight of the missile. Semi-active radar homing (SARH) is by far the most common "all weather" guidance solution for anti-aircraft systems, both ground- and air-launched.

It has the disadvantage for air-launched systems that the launch aircraft must keep moving towards the target in order to maintain radar and guidance lock. This has the potential to bring the aircraft within range of shorter-ranged IR-guided (infrared-guided) missile systems. It is an important consideration now that "all aspect" IR missiles are capable of "kills" from head on, something which did not prevail in the early days of guided missiles. For ships and mobile or fixed ground-based systems, this is irrelevant as the speed (and often size) of the launch platform precludes "running away" from the target or opening the range so as to make the enemy attack fail.

SALH is similar to SARH but uses a laser as a signal. Another difference is that most laser-guided weapons employ turret-mounted laser designators which increase the launching aircraft's ability to maneuver after launch. How much maneuvering can be done by the guiding aircraft depends on the turret field of view and the system's ability to maintain a lock-on while maneuvering. As most air-launched, laser-guided munitions are employed against surface targets the designator providing the guidance to the missile need not be the launching aircraft; designation can be provided by another aircraft or by a completely separate source (frequently troops on the ground equipped with the appropriate laser designator).

Passive homing

Infrared homing is a passive system that homes in on the heat generated by the target. Typically used in the anti-aircraft role to track the heat of jet engines, it has also been used in the anti-vehicle role with some success. This means of guidance is sometimes also referred to as "heat seeking".

Contrast seekers use a television camera, typically black and white, to image a field of view in front of the missile, which is presented to the operator. When launched, the electronics in the missile look for the spot on the image where the contrast changes the fastest, both vertically and horizontally, and then attempts to keep that spot at a constant location in its view. Contrast seekers have been used for air-to-ground missiles, including the AGM-65 Maverick, because most ground targets can be distinguished only by visual means. However they rely on there being strong contrast changes to track, and even traditional camouflage can render them unable to "lock on".

Retransmission homing

Retransmission homing, also called "track-via-missile" or "TVM", is a hybrid between command guidance, semi-active radar homing and active radar homing. The missile picks up radiation broadcast by the tracking radar which bounces off the target and relays it to the tracking station, which relays commands back to the missile.

AI guidance

In 2017, Russian weapons manufacturer Tactical Missiles Corporation announced that it was developing missiles that would use artificial intelligence to choose their own targets. In 2019, the United States Army announced it was developing a similar technology.

GOLIS systems

Whatever the mechanism used in a go-onto-location-in-space guidance system is, it must contain preset information about the target. These systems' main characteristic is the lack of a target tracker. The guidance computer and the missile tracker are located in the missile. The lack of target tracking in GOLIS necessarily implies navigational guidance.

Navigational guidance is any type of guidance executed by a system without a target tracker. The other two units are on board the missile. These systems are also known as self-contained guidance systems; however, they are not always entirely autonomous due to the missile trackers used. They are subdivided by their missile tracker's function as follows:

 Entirely autonomous – Systems where the missile tracker does not depend on any external navigation source, and can be divided into:
 Inertial guidance
 With a gimballed gyrostabilized platform or fluid-suspended gyrostabilized platform 
 With strapdown inertial guidance
 Preset guidance

 Dependent on natural sources – Navigational guidance systems where the missile tracker depends on a natural external source:
 Celestial guidance
 Astro-inertial guidance
 Terrestrial guidance
 Topographic reconnaissance (Ex: TERCOM)
 Photographic reconnaissance (Ex: DSMAC)
 Magnetic guidance

 Dependent on artificial sources – Navigational guidance systems where the missile tracker depends on an artificial external source:
 Satellite navigation
 Global positioning system (GPS)
 Global navigation satellite system (GLONASS)
 Hyperbolic navigation
 DECCA
 LORAN C

Preset guidance
Preset guidance is the simplest type of missile guidance. From the distance and direction of the target, the trajectory of the flight path is determined.  Before firing, this information is programmed into the missile's guidance system, which, during flight, maneuvers the missile to follow that path. All of the guidance components (including sensors such as accelerometers or gyroscopes) are contained within the missile, and no outside information (such as radio instructions) is used. An example of a missile using preset guidance is the V-2 rocket.

Inertial guidance

Inertial guidance uses sensitive measurement devices to calculate the location of the missile due to the acceleration put on it after leaving a known position. Early mechanical systems were not very accurate, and required some sort of external adjustment to allow them to hit targets even the size of a city. Modern systems use solid state ring laser gyros that are accurate to within metres over ranges of 10,000 km, and no longer require additional inputs.  Gyroscope development has culminated in the AIRS found on the MX missile, allowing for an accuracy of less than 100 m at intercontinental ranges. Many civilian aircraft use inertial guidance using a ring laser gyroscope, which is less accurate than the mechanical systems found in ICBMs, but which provide an inexpensive means of attaining a fairly accurate fix on location (when most airliners such as Boeing's 707 and 747 were designed, GPS was not the widely commercially available means of tracking that it is today). Today guided weapons can use a combination of INS, GPS and radar terrain mapping to achieve extremely high levels of accuracy such as that found in modern cruise missiles.

Inertial guidance is most favored for the initial guidance and reentry vehicles of strategic missiles, because it has no external signal and cannot be jammed. Additionally, the relatively low precision of this guidance method is less of an issue for large nuclear warheads.

Astro-inertial guidance

Astro-inertial guidance is a sensor fusion-information fusion of inertial guidance and celestial navigation. It is usually employed on submarine-launched ballistic missiles. Unlike silo-based intercontinental ballistic missiles, whose launch point does not move and thus can serve as a reference, SLBMs are launched from moving submarines, which complicates the necessary navigational calculations and increases circular error probable. This stellar-inertial guidance is used to correct small position and velocity errors that result from launch condition uncertainties due to errors in the submarine navigation system and errors that may have accumulated in the guidance system during the flight due to imperfect instrument calibration.

The USAF sought a precision navigation system for maintaining route accuracy and target tracking at very high speeds. Nortronics, Northrop's electronics development division, had developed an astro-inertial navigation system (ANS), which could correct inertial navigation errors with celestial observations, for the SM-62 Snark missile, and a separate system for the ill-fated AGM-48 Skybolt missile, the latter of which was adapted for the SR-71.

It uses star positioning to fine-tune the accuracy of the inertial guidance system after launch. As the accuracy of a missile is dependent upon the guidance system knowing the exact position of the missile at any given moment during its flight, the fact that stars are a fixed reference point from which to calculate that position makes this a potentially very effective means of improving accuracy.

In the Trident missile system this was achieved by a single camera that was trained to spot just one star in its expected position (it is believed that the missiles from Soviet submarines would track two separate stars to achieve this), if it was not quite aligned to where it should be then this would indicate that the inertial system was not precisely on target and a correction would be made.

Terrestrial guidance

TERCOM, for "terrain contour matching", uses altitude maps of the strip of land from the launch site to the target, and compares them with information from a radar altimeter on board. More sophisticated TERCOM systems allow the missile to fly a complex route over a full 3D map, instead of flying directly to the target. TERCOM is the typical system for cruise missile guidance, but is being supplanted by GPS systems and by DSMAC, digital scene-matching area correlator, which employs a camera to view an area of land, digitizes the view, and compares it to stored scenes in an onboard computer to guide the missile to its target.

DSMAC is reputed to be so lacking in robustness that destruction of prominent buildings marked in the system's internal map (such as by a preceding cruise missile) upsets its navigation.

See also
 Artillery fuze
 Countermeasure
 Electronic warfare
 List of missiles
 Magnetic proximity fuze
 Precision bombing
 Precision-guided munition
 Proximity fuze
 Proximity sensor
 Terminal guidance

References

External links

 
Missile operation
Missile technology
Tracking
Targeting (warfare)